Abel Aken Hunter (September 18, 1877 – April 6, 1935) was an American botanist notable for his contributions to science primarily in the collection of the orchids of Panama. From 1915 to 1935, he was a team member on scientifically significant orchid hunting expeditions with many of the collectors and researchers of the day: Charles Powell, George Pring, Carroll Dodge, Julian Steyermark, and Paul Allen. He earned his reputation in field work as an outgrowth of his friendship with Charles Powell. In a unique period in Panama's history, his first orchid collecting adventure took place with Powell during a fishing trip on the newly man-made Gatun Lake in 1912. By 1915, both Hunter and Powell were living and working in Balboa, Panama. As a hobby, Powell started an orchid garden. Beginning in 1918, the two men would spend leave periods from their employment on extended collecting expeditions: their mission morphing over the years from that of hobby collecting to systematic scientific collecting. In 1919, Powell submitted their findings for identification to German botanist Rudolf Schlechter who published, in 1922, Orchidaceae Powellianae Panamenses, a 95-page study of Powell's Panama orchids—Schlechter naming five of the new to science species to honor Hunter.

To supplement the plant collection at the Missouri Botanical Garden's (MBG) Tropical Station in Balboa, Panama, in 1927, Hunter trekked with George Pring on a month-long collecting expedition in Panama's Chiriquí region. In 1928, Hunter became the second manager of the Tropical Station. In 1934–35, as part of MBG collection teams including Carroll Dodge, Julian Steyermark, Paul Allen and Hunter, more than 740 collection records (herbarium specimens) crediting Hunter were submitted for study to the MBG's herbarium in St. Louis, Missouri; Hunter's specimen records are found online in the Tropicos database. Hunter and Allen's herbarium specimens can be found in the Oakes Ames Herbarium at Harvard University—four of which proved to be new to science species. The records generated by these expeditions not only document the time and location of specific species but continue to provide scientists and anyone wishing to see them an opportunity for study via digital images in virtual herbaria.

Early life
Born in Lincoln, Nebraska, to Mary Abba (née Crooker) and Joseph H. Hunter, Abel was the third-born of four children.
About 1870, Joseph Hunter (1843-1880) was admitted to the Illinois bar, initially opening his law practice in Mendota, Illinois. There he met and married Mary Crooker. After the birth of their daughter, Alice Cushman Hunter (1874), the pioneer family moved 400 miles west to Lincoln, Nebraska, where Walter David (1875), Abel Aken (1877), and Joseph Slayton Hunter (1879) were born. In 1880, the U. S. Federal Mortality Schedule documented Joseph H. Hunter's death: cause—typhoid fever. In a biography of Abel's older brother, Walter David Hunter (entomologist), the Hunter children were mentioned: "He [Walter] and the other children in the family were apparently born naturalists, for they knew all the birds and many of the plants and insects around Lincoln."

While studying for a higher education, on January 3, 1893, Hunter (age 15) was appointed to the United States Postal Service (USPS).

At the University of Nebraska, he studied botany and in 1898 was appointed by the Board of Regents as a plant collector. That same year, Hunter along with George G. Hedgcock submitted a paper "Thorea" after discovering a rare seaweed [Thorea ramosissima Bory] in Lancaster County, Nebraska. By 1900, Hunter left the university's employ and began working full-time for the USPS. The May 4, 1901, issue of the Nebraska State Journal reported: "A. A. Hunter, who has for several years been doing work in the department of botany, has accepted a position [with the USPS] in Grand Island [Nebraska]."

Family life and career, fraternal organizations
On July 24, 1901, in North Platte, Nebraska, Abel A. Hunter married Mary A. Dixon (1875-1963); they had one son, Raymond Dixon Hunter (1902-1928). In 1905 Hunter's annual salary with the USPS was $700. He was promoted to mail order clerk on January 1, 1906; in July, Hunter transferred to Panama. By working in Gorgona, in the Canal Zone, his salary jumped to $1500 per year. He would work for the USPS for the next 29 years, ultimately receiving the postmastership at Balboa.

Fraternal organizations
Hunter was an active member of two service organizations. In 1909, at the lodge institution of the Knights of Pythias, Hunter is recorded as a prelate. In Gorgona, at the January 16, 1912, meeting of the IOOF (International Order of Odd Fellows) Isthmian Canal Lodge No. 1, after having been elected by the membership, Hunter was installed as the Noble Grand, the highest officer position.

All about orchids

First they went fishing

In 1910, Charles Powell, a dispensary nurse, transferred to Gorgona where Hunter was working. Although Powell was 23 years older than Hunter, a friendship took root between the two men—one that would last roughly 17 years. About 1912, as Gatun Lake filled (part of the construction plan for the Panama Canal), Powell and Hunter purchased a motor boat for fishing; there they discovered dove orchids growing upon the tops of some of the thousands of dying trees (dying as they were submerged by the rising water). Hunter exclaimed:

Instead of fish, they brought "a boat-load of orchids back to Gorgona where they were disseminated over the Canal Zone, the United States, and Europe." About 1913 or 1914, canal work in Gorgona would end (the town would eventually be submerged); Hunter and Powell transferred to Balboa. In late 1915, Powell started what would eventually become a worldwide-known orchid garden.

Hunting with Powell

Hunter and Powell coordinated their leave periods to hunt in localities beyond the local area; they made collecting trips to the Chiriquí Province in 1918, 1920, and 1922. In 1918, Powell started submitting pressed, mounted, documented orchid specimens to researchers: first to R. Allen Rolfe in England and then to Rudolf Schlechter in Germany. Rolfe died before completing his study of Powell's specimens and Schlechter took up their taxonomy. In 1922, Schlechter published Orchidaceae Powellianae Panamenses a 95-page study of Powell's orchids, naming five species after Hunter (see "Legacy" below). About Hunter, Schlechter noted: "[Hunter] der sich oft an den Sammelexkursionen beteiligte" which loosely translates to "Hunter often took part in the collecting field trips." In 1924 (after visiting Panama in 1923), The Smithsonian Institution's Paul Standley reported: "For the past ten years Mr. Powell, very often in company with Mr. A. A. Hunter, has conducted systematic exploration in many parts of the country, visiting distant localities, especially the high mountains of Chiriquí. In March 1925, Hunter and Powell went on a collecting trip to the Santa Fe in Veraguas Province.

The Tropical Station
Beginning with a 7,000-plant garden donated by Charles Powell in 1926, the Missouri Botanical Garden created its Tropical Station in Balboa, Panama; Powell was its first director. Abel A. Hunter followed in 1928 and under his directorship, the Tropical Station thrived in a time when the world's economy was in turmoil; collecting continued and it was recognized as "one of the show places on the Canal Zone." In 1931, a herbarium specimen from a plant flowering in the Tropical Station was submitted to the MBG crediting Mary Hunter as the collector. Hunter managed the Tropical Station for roughly seven years until his death in April 1935; Mary took over the management of the Tropical Station until a replacement could be found (late 1936). Hunter's 1935 collecting partner, Paul Allen, became its third and final director. Allen ran the MBG's Tropical Station until 1939 when it was transferred to the Canal Zone Government. In writing his sections on Orchidaceae for the MBG's 1946-1949 The Flora of Panama, Allen cited Powell and Hunter's work. "During its almost 13 years of existence, the Tropical Station supplied the greenhouses in Saint Louis with a constant flow of living plants." From Panama and St. Louis, duplicate plants were loaned to expositions, gifted, or exchanged with other institutions (American and foreign). Due to the efforts of many, including Hunter, "The Missouri Botanical Garden’s orchid collection represents one of the largest and finest in the United States."

Hunting with Pring

In March 1927, George Harry Pring, Horticulturist to the MBG, made a trip to the Canal Zone; he and Hunter made arrangements for a month-long expedition in the Chiriqui region (Hunter providing the continuity of knowledge). Due to his advanced age, Powell stayed in Balboa to receive their orchid shipments. Hunter and Pring's mission was to collect orchids to supplement the ones found at the newly created MBG's Tropical Station. They booked passage on a cattle boat to travel from Panama Bay to Port Pedregal. After a thirty-four-hour voyage, and a delay due to tides, the men finally arrived in southwest Panama; continuing on, they arrived in David, Chiriquí for the night. Traveling an additional thirty miles by "motor", climbing from an altitude of 500 feet to 3800 feet, they reached their base of operations in Boquete, Chiriquí: a prime habitat for orchids. Their search area covered a radius of twenty miles. Pring reported: "To obtain varied genera and new species it is necessary to climb the 'barrancas' [steep, rocky slopes], ford streams, cut one's way through the jungle, and hunt for the coveted orchid, and it is truly a hunt. Hunter's sharp eyes detected almost everything within range." 
The nitty-gritty of the 1927 collecting expedition

Typically beginning their day at six o'clock in the morning, the men would rub their skin with an insect repellent (to ward off ticks and red bugs). Mostly they travelled on horseback and ideally with a guide. Epiphytic orchids (growing non-parasitically in trees) were collected by climbing the trees. Orchids found in trees too tall to climb were removed by the use of a fork-top sapling cut on site. When the plants were within reach a machete was used to separate the orchid plant from the tree (machetes were also necessary for opening up trails). At times, the men would dismount and tie up their horses to search deeper in the dense jungle. The first week they collected 75 plants of Odontoglossum powellii.
 
Image of Hunter harvesting an Odontoglossum powellii with a machete.

Hoping to find a rare, epiphytic species (chinela), they contacted A. Guterriez, a coffee plantation owner in Palo Alto, who reported he had not seen one in years. He furnished a guide who took the men to a tract where most of the trees had been cut down in preparation for a coffee plantation. Disappointed after collecting with no luck, Pring observed what he thought to be a Maxillaria. He climbed the tree and came down with the plant in his mouth. Upon further examination he discovered he had found the coveted chinela. Pring wrote: "In my excitement I forgot my guide and rushed to tell Hunter, 'I've found it, I've found it.'" They feverishly combed all the fallen trees and collected thirty good specimens. Pring added: "Such a clearing is undoubtedly the orchid collector's paradise."

Traveling along the Caldera River, they set their sights on locating a Mormodes; Hunter having found them there on previous trips. They came upon a large half-rotten tree and Hunter remarked, "Here's where we'll find them if we are in luck." They found six.

Some bungle in the jungle
The swan orchid, genus Cycnoches, and the monk's hood orchid, genus Catasetum, were next on their orchid-finding wish list. A guide was arranged to take them to the llano (a treeless, grassy plain) at Caldera but he was unavailable. They decided to go on without him; but not before buying some emergency provisions. After riding  hours, they realized they had missed the trail; after some backtracking and three more hours in the saddle they reached their planned destination, the home of Martez Gonzales. The Gonzales family consisted of Grandma, Mr. Gonzales, his wife and two children. After lunch, the men mounted their horses and rode all afternoon without much luck; twelve hours in the saddle that day and practically no orchids. After dinner and ready for rest, the men were taken into the family's one-room, dirt-floor hut. It was built of palm leaves, cane, and mud; it had two doors and no windows. About this night Pring recounted: "The air soon became rather close and then strange noises came to my ears which sounded like something flying, and about that time a large cock-roach landed on my nose. In my excitement my bed almost collapsed." At breakfast, the men were discussing the hunt for the Cycnoches. Catasetums were observed within easy reach. Hunter noticed a plant stuck in the tree just outside the house and brought it to Pring's attention. Grandma noticed Pring's interest and assured the hunters that there were plenty of them growing all around. Gonzales guided them to the area where the swan orchid grew; a two-hour hunt netted five plants. Grandma, Gonzales's wife, and the children assisted in the hunt, contributing one or two pants apiece; by the end of the day, twelve excellent plants had been collected.

The Volcán Barú 
Upon arrival on the southwest side of the volcano, another coffee plantation owner, T. B. Moeniche, knew of several promising places for orchids and offered his guide, Emiliano. They spent two days with Emiliano; he was quite agile and could run along felled trees. Hunter and Pring, however, had on boots and made slow progress on the slippery, barkless "poles." Vines and under growth concealed the distance from these trees to the ground. Hunter lost his balance and fell about fifteen feet; Pring fell too and at that point, the men decided to travel on the ground. Satisfied with their findings, they returned to Boquete and packed their plants for shipment. Next, they travelled to David (thirty miles) on the other side of the volcano and took a train to Concepcion. After an 8 1/2 horseback ride to an elevation of 5800 feet, they collected several hundred plants, shipping them via mule-pack train to Concepcion.

Return to Balboa
The expedition was cut short due to Pring experiencing a mild attack of dysentery.

Pring reported the collection results: "In all, we had collected about 126 species of plants embracing 58 genera, and there are still 12 kinds of plants unidentified."

American Orchid Society's Third Annual National Orchid Show

On April 29, 1928, The Brooklyn Daily Eagle (Brooklyn, New York) ran an article by Anthony Muto titled "Rare Panama Orchids on way to Brooklyn Botanic Garden." A synopsized version of Muto's report follows: "Eight cases of orchids including 35 varieties of rare Panamanian specimens, which will eventually form the nucleus of an orchid collection at the Brooklyn Botanic Garden, are now en route to New York for the national exhibition of the American Orchid Society. These rare flowers were collected at great risk in the jungle regions of Panama. A. A. Hunter, director of the Missouri Botanical Garden's tropical station in Balboa, personally supervised the collecting and preparing of the specimens. More than a year of patient and extremely difficult work was needed to complete the collection. Collectors had to brave the perils of the jungles. Mr. Hunter carefully transplanted them on logs. Some were placed in baskets. Many of the specimens are not yet in bloom and Mr. Hunter, who is accompanying the collection to New York, hopes they will flower during the exhibition. Among the varieties included in the collection are the dove orchid, the yellow butterfly, bucket orchid, Christmas orchid, Lady of the Night, 'monkey face' orchid, and Epidendrum fragrans." On May 11, 1928, The Brooklyn Daily Eagle (Brooklyn, New York) reported on the three-day Third Annual National Orchid Show held at Madison Square Garden: "A mile of orchids, representing every known variety and worth more than $1,000,000 may be seen in the exhibit." Hunter's display was described thusly: "Another extraordinary collection in the show was brought from the jungles of Central America by A. A. Hunter of Balboa, Panama."

The 1934-35 collecting teams: Dodge, Steyermark, Hunter and Allen
Madden Lake (now  Lake Alajuela) was created by the construction of Madden Dam as part of the Panama Canal watershed management. Similar to the orchid collection opportunity afforded by the creation of Gatun Lake, a unique opportunity for orchid collecting in "a drowned jungle" occurred again, prompting a need for a botanical expedition. In November 1934, George Moore, director of the MBG, sent researchers Carroll William Dodge (to lead the expedition), Julian Steyermark and Paul Allen (apprentice) to collect with Hunter (working at the Tropical Station). The trip was financed by the Science Research Fund of Washington University in St. Louis in cooperation with the MBG. Allen remained several weeks longer; he and Hunter were to collect in the Coclé Province (working over the Continental Divide from Penonomé to the Atlantic Slope). Hunter's name appears on 740+ specimen submissions from different combinations of collection teams; the herbarium specimens are found mainly in the MBG's herbarium (MO) and are found in its virtual herbarium database (Tropicos).

Finding the long-sought prize, Sobralia powellii

The native home of the Sobralia powellii was unknown, so the collection team of Hunter and Allen set out to find it. A description of the Sobralia powellii is found in Powell's herbarium specimen's field notes: "Flowers white, with a bronze throat, bordered with cherry shading." Hunter suspected it would be found in the jungle near the head-waters of the Rio Boqueron. On the second day, traveling by native dugout (cayuca), the men encounter numerous violent squalls. Poles were cut to drive the cayuca up through "boiling rapids" costing another half-day of time but allowing the men to reach an absolutely unexplored region. The next day violent tropical rain continued non-stop. Their guide made a trail through the jungle and the men followed having to portage their equipment while struggling to move forward along "slippery clay ridges or through fast streams." Upon reaching the river at this point, they found it flowing through canyon-like gorges. Collecting had been poor; the men were discouraged. Having spent too much time in its search, they decided to give up. Finding themselves at the brink of a pool, drenched from the rain and needing a break, Allen jump into the pool fully clothed. In his report of the remainder of the experience, Allen wrote: "Climbing out [of the pool] on the opposite side my astonished gaze was met by a plant with great milky white buds nearly ready to open. The long-sought prize, Sobralia powellii, had been found.  Its native home was no longer a mystery. After searching feverishly the surrounding territory, three more plants were found, so there are now about a dozen plants of this rare orchid at the Tropical Station and one small plant at the Arboretum at Gray Summit."

An image of the native home of the Sobralia powellii collecting area is hosted online by Missouri Digital Heritage, courtesy of the Missouri Botanical Garden.

The intense collecting done by Hunter and Allen resulted in the discovery of no less than four new species: 

Examples of Hunter and Allen's herbarium specimens
Nine distinct specimens can be found at Harvard University's Herbarium (AMES).
                                                              
For Masdevallia tenuissima C. Schweinf. #587

For Pleurothallis rotundata C. Schweinf. #561

During this expedition period, Hunter and Allen collected roughly 6,000 plants. Before they could accomplish their objectives in Panama, Hunter unexpectedly died; Allen continued hunting without him into May 1935.

Recognition

For USPS work
In 1908, Abel A. Hunter was awarded the Roosevelt Medal for two years of continuous distinguished civilian work as an employee of the Isthmian Canal Commission (employees of the Panama Railroad Company were also eligible). Over the next six years he received three service bars (third bar awarded on July 30, 1914). Of roughly 50,000 workers, only 519 medalists earned the medal with three bars only. Hunter's service record in the Canal Zone's Government and Sanitation department succinctly documents his USPS work.

For field work
While roaming the countryside of his youth, Hunter was intrigued by the natural world around him. He focused his studies at the state university on botany. In 1898 he co-published a paper on a rare seaweed discovered in Nebraska and worked for the University of Nebraska as a plant collector. Once established in Panama he returned to nature through fishing, which led to a friendship with Powell and over two decades of scientifically significant orchid collecting. His work with Powell led to Schlechter naming five new to science species in Hunter's honor. 750+ herbarium specimens bear his name as co-collector or collector with Dodge, Steyermark and Allen. With Allen, he contributed to the discovery of at least four new to science orchid species.

Death

On April 6, 1935, at the age of 57, Abel A. Hunter died. His wife, Mary (née Dixon) Hunter, his mother Mary (née Crooker) Hunter, and two siblings survived him.
Legacy

In Schlechter's Orchidaceae Powellianae Panamenses (Powell's Panama Orchids), five new species were dedicated to Hunter.

See also
List of orchidologists
The Plant List A worldwide, comprehensive, searchable database.
Tropicos (Missouri Botanical Garden) A botanical database.

References 

1935 deaths
People from Lincoln, Nebraska
Orchids of Panama
1877 births
Missouri Botanical Garden people
American botanists
University of Nebraska–Lincoln alumni